Kotma is a town and a municipality in Anuppur district in the Indian state of Madhya Pradesh.

Demographics
 India census, Kotma had a population of 88484. Males constitute 52.5% of the population and females 42.5%. Kotma has an average literacy rate of 67%, male literacy is 75.5%, and female literacy is 57.5%. In Kotma, 20% of the population is under 6 years of age.

Geography
It has an average elevation of 517 metres (1696 feet).

References

Cities and towns in Anuppur district